Vern L. Schramm (born November 9, 1941) is a Professor & Ruth Merns Chair in Biochemistry at the Albert Einstein College of Medicine of Yeshiva University. Schramm was elected to the National Academy of Sciences in 2007. His laboratory's research focuses on the elucidation of enzymatic mechanisms and transition state structure.

This information is then used for the logical design of transition-state inhibitors which have the potential to be new biologically active agents. Some of these are in development to be drugs.  Schramm's work has translated basic chemical understanding at the quantum mechanical level to a new approach to drug development.

Education
Schramm earned his bachelor's degree from South Dakota State College, now South Dakota State University. He earned his master's degree in nutrition from Harvard University and his Ph.D. in the mechanism of enzyme action from the Australian National University.

Career
Schramm secured a postdoctoral position at the NASA Ames Research Center after graduation. Later he joined the Temple University School of Medicine as a faculty member. In 1987 he joined the faculty at Albert Einstein College of Medicine as professor and chair of the biochemistry department.

Awards and distinctions
 1999 - Rudi Lemberg Award from the Australian Academy of Science
 2006 - Repligen Corporation Award in Chemistry of Biological Processes from the Biological Chemistry Division of the American Chemical Society
 Harry Eagle Award for Outstanding Basic Science Teaching from Albert Einstein College of Medicine
 George A. Sowell Award for Excellence in Teaching from Temple University School of Medicine

References

External links
 Schramm's profile on Biomed Experts
 Schramm et al publications on PubMed

Living people
American biochemists
South Dakota State University alumni
Harvard University alumni
Australian National University alumni
Temple University faculty
Yeshiva University faculty
Members of the United States National Academy of Sciences
1941 births
People from Howard, South Dakota